Stanisław Baj  (born 3 June 1953 in Dołhobrody) is a Polish painter.

External links
Biography at the European Art Academy 

20th-century Polish painters
20th-century Polish male artists
21st-century Polish painters
21st-century Polish male artists
1953 births
Living people
Polish male painters
People from Włodawa County